The West Indian cricket team in England in 1963 played 30 first-class matches of which they won 15, lost 2 and drew 13.  West Indies played five Tests and won the series against England by three matches to one, with one game drawn.

As a result of the great success of this series, England's future home Test programme was revised so that West Indies could return in 1966, much earlier than originally planned. This was done by introducing "twin tours", in which two countries would each play three Tests against England in the course of a season.

The West Indies team
 Frank Worrell (captain)
 Conrad Hunte
 Easton McMorris
 Seymour Nurse
 Basil Butcher
 Joe Solomon
 Gary Sobers
 David Allan (wicket keeper)
 Wes Hall
 Charlie Griffith
 Alfred Valentine
 Deryck Murray (wicket keeper)
 Joey Carew
 Willie Rodriguez
 Lester King
 Lance Gibbs
 Rohan Kanhai

Test series

First Test

Second Test

This match had a very exciting climax. When time ran out, England were six runs short of the 234 that they needed to win. The ninth wicket fell when Derek Shackleton was run out from the fourth ball of the final over. Colin Cowdrey had had his left arm broken earlier in the innings, and had retired hurt. Now he reappeared, with his arm in plaster. Luckily for him, and for England, he was not required to face a ball, David Allen playing out the remaining two deliveries.

Third Test

Fourth Test

Fifth Test

Run and wicket aggregates

All first-class matches
leading batsmen
Conrad Hunte – 1367 runs @ 44.09
Gary Sobers – 1333 @ 47.60
Basil Butcher – 1294 @ 44.62
Rohan Kanhai – 1149 @ 41.03

leading bowlers
Charlie Griffith – 119 wickets @ 12.83
Gary Sobers – 82 @ 22.48
Lance Gibbs – 78 @ 20.05
Wes Hall – 74 @ 21.70

Test matches
leading batsmen
Rohan Kanhai – 497 runs @ 55.22
Conrad Hunte – 471 @ 58.57
Basil Butcher – 383 @ 47.87
Gary Sobers – 322 @ 40.25

leading bowlers
Charlie Griffith – 32 wickets @ 16.21
Lance Gibbs – 26 @ 21.30
Gary Sobers – 20 @ 28.55
Wes Hall – 16 @ 33.37

See also
 Wisden Trophy
 1963 English cricket season

External sources
 CricketArchive – tour summaries

Annual reviews
 Playfair Cricket Annual 1964
 Wisden Cricketers' Almanack 1964

Further reading

 
 

1963 in West Indian cricket
1963 in English cricket
1963
International cricket competitions from 1960–61 to 1970